Athanasia Perra (born 2 February 1983 in Pyrgos) is a Greek triple jumper.

Career
She finished tenth at the 2002 World Junior Championships. She also competed at the 2004 Olympic Games, the 2005 World Championships, the 2007 World Championships, the 2008 Olympic Games and the 2012 Olympic Games without reaching the final.  She did however reach the final of the 2013 World Championships.

She won the gold medal in the Mediterranean Games of Pescara with a personal best jump at 14.62 metres, in July 2009.

In 2017, a retest of her sample from the 2009 World Championships showed presence of an illegal substance and was banned from competition  from 4 May 2017 until 3 May 2021. In addition, all of her results between 15 August 2009 and 14 August 2011 were voided.

International competitions

References

External links

1983 births
Living people
Greek female triple jumpers
Athletes (track and field) at the 2004 Summer Olympics
Athletes (track and field) at the 2008 Summer Olympics
Athletes (track and field) at the 2012 Summer Olympics
Olympic athletes of Greece
Sportspeople from Pyrgos, Elis
World Athletics Championships athletes for Greece
Doping cases in athletics
Greek sportspeople in doping cases
Mediterranean Games gold medalists for Greece
Athletes (track and field) at the 2009 Mediterranean Games
Athletes (track and field) at the 2013 Mediterranean Games
Mediterranean Games medalists in athletics